You Were a Diamond is the debut album from indie rock band Clem Snide.  It was originally released in 1998 on Tractor Beam Records, and later reissued on spinART. It received favorable reviews and landed the band a following playing clubs in the Northeastern United States. As of 2002, it had sold about 1,000 copies.

Track listing
All tracks composed by Eef Barzelay; except where noted.
 "Better" - 3:54
 "Nick Drake Tape" - 4:07
 "Row" - 4:11
 "Your Night to Shine" - 3:58
 "I Can't Stay Here Tonight" - 3:23
 "Yip/Jump Music (Daniel Johnston)" - 3:49
 "Uglier Than You" - 3:01
 "Fruit Salad Stains" - 4:37
 "Lost on the River" (Hank Williams) - 3:04
 "Nothing is Over, Not Yet" - 3:56
 "Chinese Baby" - 2:33

The spinART reissue contained the following bonus tracks:

12. "Accident"
13. "Estranged Half Brother"

References

1998 debut albums
Clem Snide albums
SpinART Records albums
Albums produced by Adam Lasus